Sunshine Valley is an unincorporated community consisting of cabins, tiny homes, and RV parks on the Crowsnest Highway between the town of Hope (NW) and the entrance to Manning Park in the Cascade Mountains of British Columbia. The community has its own volunteer fire department (SVVFD), recreation centre, heated outdoor pool, and playground. As of 2016, the population of Sunshine Valley is 177.

History 
During World War II, Sunshine Valley was named Tashme. The area was used as a Japanese Canadian internment camp. Opened September 8, 1942, it was designed to house 500 families, making it one of the largest and last camps in B.C., and was located just outside the 100-mile "quarantine" zone from which all Japanese Canadians were removed. Men housed in the camp were employed in the construction of the highway during the war.

After the war, the site was sold off and has continued in existence as a proposed Boy's Town, the Allison Lumber Company (a combined lumber and mine venture) and then a small campground and recreational community. It served as the basetown for the small Silvertip Ski Area which was located at the head of Tearse Creek, a tributary of the Upper Sumallo River which flows north into the town from the south and upon entering the town, turns southeast and enters Manning Park. In Hope, there is a Tashme Friendship Garden in memory of the camp and its residents.

In popular culture
The Tashme internment camp is one of the settings in the 2018 novel Floating City by author Kerri Sakamoto.

See also
List of internment camps
Judo in British Columbia

References

Hastings Park to Tashme 100 Mile Journey, Mike Gerard, The Bulletin, a Journal of Japanese Canadian community, history and culture, August 3, 2008,

External links
TASHME: Life in a Japanese Canadian Internment Camp, 1942-1946
Discover Nikkei Website: Description of Tashme
Discover Nikkei Website: Photo collection (Nos. 4, 5 and 8 are of Tashme)

Designated places in British Columbia
Unincorporated settlements in British Columbia
Canadian Cascades
Ghost towns in British Columbia
Internment of Japanese Canadians
World War II internment camps in Canada